Juan José Expósito Ruiz (born 28 October 1985), commonly known as Juanjo, is a Spanish former professional footballer who played as a forward.

He amassed Segunda División totals of 276 matches and 43 goals over ten seasons, in representation of Sevilla Atlético, Alavés, Córdoba, Salamanca, Numancia, Ponferradina, Tenerife, Llagostera and Almería. In La Liga, he appeared for Racing de Santander and Sevilla.

Club career
Juanjo was born in Santander. After making his professional debut with hometown club Racing de Santander during 2004–05, he was relatively used (mainly as a substitute) over the course of the following two seasons. His maiden La Liga appearance took place on 22 May 2005, as the Cantabrians lost 2–0 at Málaga CF.

Juanjo was loaned in 2007–08, spending the campaign at Sevilla FC's reserves and scoring seven league goals to help them retain their Segunda División status. However, due to injuries and international duty, he also appeared in one top-division match on 12 January 2008, playing 30 minutes in a 2–0 away defeat against Athletic Bilbao.

In July 2008, Juanjo returned to Santander and, on 31 August, in 2008–09's opener, scored as a late substitute in a 1–1 home draw with former side Sevilla. However, after the arrival on loan of Serbian Nikola Žigić during the 2009 winter transfer window, he was deemed surplus to requirements, moving also on loan to Deportivo Alavés until the end of the season; another forward, Toni Moral, was bought from the Basques.

After not being able to help Alavés avoid relegation, Juanjo returned to his alma mater. In the dying minutes of the August 2009 transfer window a third consecutive loan was arranged, now to Córdoba CF. During the second-tier campaign, although heavily featured, he only managed to score once for the Andalusians; in the off-season, he was definitely released by Racing and signed for another club in division two, UD Salamanca.

Juanjo continued competing in the second division the following years, with CD Numancia and SD Ponferradina. He scored eight goals in 34 games in 2011–12 with the former team, helping to a final tenth-place finish.

Juanjo subsequently represented second-tier sides CD Tenerife, UE Llagostera and UD Almería, suffering relegation with the second in 2016. On 2 August 2017 he returned to his first club Racing, now in the third league.

References

External links

1985 births
Living people
Spanish footballers
Footballers from Santander, Spain
Association football forwards
La Liga players
Segunda División players
Segunda División B players
Tercera División players
Rayo Cantabria players
Racing de Santander players
Sevilla Atlético players
Sevilla FC players
Deportivo Alavés players
Córdoba CF players
UD Salamanca players
CD Numancia players
SD Ponferradina players
CD Tenerife players
UE Costa Brava players
UD Almería players